Il commissario di ferro ( is a 1978 Italian poliziottesco film directed by Stelvio Massi.

Plot 
Commissioner Mauro Mariani is known for his severity towards criminals and for his habit of acting on his own, which cost him the transition from Dr. Crivelli's mobile team to a simple neighborhood police station, where he can assist him. it's Brigadier Ingravallo.

One day, while Mariani is with his wife Vera and his son Claudio, from whom he usually lives separated, a boy named Sergio Conforti bursts into his office and, holding an officer under the gun, forces him to call the absent commissioner because he wants to kill, considering him guilty of his father's suicide, arrested by Mariani two years earlier. The commissioner finds out about it when Vera and Claudio, having gone to the office to wait for him, end up in the hands of Conforti.

The boy, in a delirium of revenge, takes the child with him and later telephones the inspector asking him to pick him up where and when he knows. Initially Mariani does not understand the message; then, reconstructing the arrest of Sergio's father, he ends up remembering. He is forced to evade the surveillance of Crivelli and, arriving near a railway yard, is forced to face Sergio: he will be able to neutralize him and, even if wounded, to save his son.

Cast 
Maurizio Merli as Commissioner Mauro Mariani 
Janet Agren as Vera Mariani 
Ettore Manni as Sergeant Ingravallo
Chris Avram as Commissioner Capo Crivelli 
Mariangela Giordano as Mrs. Parolini
Enzo Fiermonte as  The Engineer
Elisa Mainardi as Concierge

Production
Maurizio Merli later described the film as "a movie made out of nothing" and that the director Stelvio Massi was not happy with the results. Merli stated that half way through production the producers went on set and said there was no money left and they had to complete production quickly.

Release
Il comissario di ferro was distributed theatrically in Italy by Belma on 7 December 1978. The film grossed a total of 847,768,660 Italian lire. Unlike Massi's other film of the period, the film was never dubbed into English for foreign markets.

See also 
 List of Italian films of 1978

Notes

References

External links

Il commissario di ferro at Variety Distribution

1978 films
Poliziotteschi films
Films directed by Stelvio Massi
Films scored by Lallo Gori
1970s Italian-language films
1970s Italian films